GO 59 is a Floating dry dock of the Marina Militare.

History 
Delivered to Arsenale Militare Marittimo di Augusta on 26 March 2014, it was transferred to Stazione Navale di Brindisi on 24 February 2016. 
These are the technical specifications of MM for its realization.

References

External links
 Ships Marina Militare website

Ships built in Italy
Auxiliary ships of the Italian Navy
2014 ships
Floating drydocks